Nanopsis is a genus of  very small sea snails, marine gastropod molluscs in the family Cerithiopsidae.

This genus is no longer accepted as the name is preoccupied by Nanopsis Freytag, 1974 (an insect of order Homoptera)

Species
Species in the genus Nanopsis have become synonyms, accepted under Cerithiopsis or Joculator, in most cases in the original combination:
 Nanopsis albovittata (C. B. Adams, 1850): synonym of Cerithiopsis albovittata (C. B. Adams, 1850)
 Nanopsis beneitoi (Rolán, Espinosa & Fernández-Garcés, 2007): synonym of Cerithiopsis beneitoi Rolán, Espinosa & Fernández-Garcés, 2007
 Nanopsis buzzurroi Cecalupo & Robba, 2010: synonym of Cerithiopsis buzzurroi (Cecalupo & Robba, 2010)
 Nanopsis denticulata Cecalupo & Robba, 2010: synonym of Cerithiopsis denticulata (Cecalupo & Robba, 2010)
 Nanopsis familiarum (Rolán, Espinosa & Fernández-Garcés, 2007): synonym of Cerithiopsis familiarum Rolán, Espinosa & Fernández-Garcés, 2007
 Nanopsis granata (Kay, 1979): synonym of Joculator granatus Kay, 1979
 Nanopsis hadfieldi (Jay & Drivas, 2002): synonym of Cerithiopsis hadfieldi Jay & Drivas, 2002
 Nanopsis iuxtafuniculata (Rolán, Espinosa & Fernández-Garcés, 2007): synonym of Cerithiopsis iuxtafuniculata Rolán, Espinosa & Fernández-Garcés, 2007
 Nanopsis lamyi (Jay & Drivas, 2002): synonym of Cerithiopsis lamyi Jay & Drivas, 2002
 Nanopsis myia (Jay & Drivas, 2002): synonym of Joculator myia Jay & Drivas, 2002
 Nanopsis nana (Jeffreys, 1867): synonym of Cerithiopsis nana Jeffreys, 1867
 Nanopsis parvada (Rolán, Espinosa & Fernández-Garcés, 2007): synonym of Cerithiopsis parvada Rolán, Espinosa & Fernández-Garcés, 2007
 Nanopsis pulvis (Issel, 1869): synonym of Cerithiopsis pulvis (Issel, 1869)

References

 Cecalupo A. & Robba E. (2010) The identity of Murex tubercularis Montagu, 1803 and description of one new genus and two new species of the Cerithiopsidae (Gastropoda: Triphoroidea). Bollettino Malacologico 46: 45-64. page(s): 53

External links

Cerithiopsidae
Gastropod genera
Obsolete gastropod taxa